Label Me is a 2019 German drama film directed by Kai Kreuser, starring  and .

Cast
  as Lars
  as Waseem
  as Junis
 Jogi Kaiser as Geschäftsmann
  as Security Chief
  as Amir
  as Charif
 Gioele Viola as Abdul Kareem
 Damon Zolfaghari as Security 2
 Emanuel Weber as Security 3
 Christoph Wielinger as Mann Anfang 40
 Lea Fleck

Reception
David Rooney of The Hollywood Reporter called the film an "evocatively shot and persuasively acted character study", as well as a "solid calling card" for Kreuser, Schuch and Benda.

Andrew Emerson of Film Threat gave the film a score of 6.5/10 and wrote that while Kreuser "stints on character development", Schuch and Benda are "dedicated and mesmerizing", and can "pack worlds of emotional nuance into something as simple as a stare or a grimace".

References

External links
 
 

German drama films
2019 drama films